Minthe is a water nymph in Greek mythology.

Minthe or Minthi may also refer to:

Minthi, a village in Elis, Greece
Minthi (mountain), a mountain in Elis, Greece
Mentha, a genus of flowering plants, including several mint

See also
Menthe (disambiguation)